This is a list of results for the Legislative Council at the 2003 New South Wales state election.

Results

Continuing members 

The following MLCs were not up for re-election this year.

See also
 Results of the 2003 New South Wales state election (Legislative Assembly)
 Candidates of the 2003 New South Wales state election
 Members of the New South Wales Legislative Council, 2003–2007

References

2003 Legislative Council